UBIT may refer to:

Unrelated Business Income Tax, a U.S. tax on a certain activities of tax-exempt organizations
U-bit, a proposed theoretical entity in quantum mechanics
UBIT, an acronym for the Department of Computer Science at the University of Karachi
University of Buffalo Information Technology, which provides technological services and support at the University of Buffalo